Marangis a.k.a. Watam is a Ramu language of Papua New Guinea. Like Bosmun, it shares a number of irregular plural markers with the Lower Sepik languages, supporting the proposal of a Ramu – Lower Sepik language family.

It is spoken in the two villages of:
Watam village, Marienberg Rural LLG, East Sepik Province
Marangis village, Yawar Rural LLG, Madang Province

Pronouns
The pronominal system of Watam has a four-way distinction, with there being a paucal ("a few", "more than two") number for pronouns in addition to singular, dual, and plural.

{| 
! person !! singular !! dual !! paucal !! plural
|-
! 1st
| yak || aŋga || apak || ae
|-
! 2nd
| u || noŋgo || niŋga || ne
|-
! 3rd
| ma || miŋga || miŋga || min
|}

Nouns
Nominal plural formatives include:

{| 
! gloss !! singular !! plural
|-
| ‘ear’ || kwar || kwair
|-
| ‘elbow’ || tutup || tutpemb
|-
| ‘buttocks’ || tok || toke
|-
| ‘leg’ || or || orar
|-
| ‘man’ || namot || namtar
|-
| ‘girl’ || namoŋ || navgor
|-
| ‘nose’ || ŋgum || gubeb
|-
| ‘bandicoot’ || maŋem || maŋbar
|-
| ‘sago’ || wak || wik
|-
| ‘betelnut’ || meɲjak || miɲjik
|}

Verbs
Watam verbal conjugation for the verb ndo ‘to see’:
{| 
! tense !! verbal form
|-
! present
| ndo-ta
|-
! present
| ndo-ri
|-
! future
| ndo-na(n)
|-
! imperative
| ndo
|}

References

Ottilien languages
Languages of Madang Province
Languages of East Sepik Province